"No Sleep" is a song by Dutch producer Martin Garrix, featuring Swedish vocalist Bonn. The song was released through labels Stmpd Rcrds and Epic Amsterdam on 21 February 2019. Garrix and Bonn previously collaborated on the single "High on Life", released in July 2018. The song was written by Garrix, Albin Nedler, and Kristoffer Fogelmark, and was produced by Garrix.

Charts

Weekly charts

Year-end charts

Certifications

References

External links
 

2019 songs
2019 singles
Martin Garrix songs
Stmpd Rcrds singles
Epic Records singles
Songs written by Martin Garrix
Songs written by Kristoffer Fogelmark
Songs written by Albin Nedler